Al Ahli Stadium may refer to:

 Hamad bin Khalifa Stadium, also known as Al Ahli SC Stadium, a multi-purpose stadium in Doha, Qatar
 Al Ahli Stadium (Bahrain), a multi-use stadium in Manama, Bahrain